Udo Markus Bentz (born 3 March 1967 in Rülzheim) is a Roman Catholic clergyman and auxiliary bishop in Mainz.

Udo Bentz first trained from 1986 to 1988 as a banker. In 1988 he entered the Mainz priesthood and studied theology and philosophy at the University of Mainz and University of Innsbruck. In 1994 the deacon ordination and the diaconate internship in Griesheim took place. He received the sacrament of the ordination of priests on 1 July 1995 for the bishopric of Mainz by Bishop Karl Lehmann

Until 1998, he worked as a chaplain in the cathedral of St. Peter and the St. Martin parish in Worms. This was followed by a four-year period as personal secretary of the Mainz Bishop Karl Lehmann. After further studies he joined Albert Raffelt at the Albert-Ludwigs-University Freiburg in 2007 with a theological-historical dissertation on Dr. theol. PhD. For this work, he was awarded the Karl Rahner Prize in 2008 by the University of Innsbruck. He was pastoral in the parish of St. Michael in Sprendlingen (2002–2004) and in the parish of St. Peter Canisius in Mainz-Gonsenheim (2004–2007). Since 2007, he is a rain of the Mainz priest seminar. In 2011, he was appointed spiritual minister by the Bishop of Mainz. In 2013, Bentz was elected Chairman of the German Regency Council, the Conference of Rectors of the Priestly Seminars in Germany. In addition to the priestly seminar, he has been teaching the seminary for pastoralists and pastoral assistants of the diocese since 2014.

See also
 Roman Catholic Diocese of Mainz#Diocese (1802-present)

References

1967 births
Living people
German Roman Catholic titular bishops
Auxiliary bishops